Mr. Saturday Night is a 1992 American comedy-drama film starring and directed by Billy Crystal.

Mr. Saturday Night may also refer to:

 Mr. Saturday Night (musical), based on the film
 Mr. Saturday Night (album), 2022 album by Jon Pardi
 Mr. Saturday Night, 2011 album by Julian Velard

See also
 "Mr. Saturday Knight", 2001 episode of the animated TV series Family Guy